Service by Muslims in the United States military dates back to the American Revolutionary War, where records indicate that there were some Muslims who fought on the revolutionary side against the British.

Muslims have fought in all major United States conflicts, including the War of 1812, the American Civil War, World War I, World War II, and the Vietnam War. More recently, they have served in the Gulf War, Iraq War, and the War in Afghanistan.

The Army Chief of Chaplains requested on December 14, 1993, that an insignia be made to symbolize Muslim chaplains, and on January 8, 1994, a crescent-shaped design was produced. 

In 2015 there were approximately 5,896 American Muslims serving in the United States military.

Before the 9/11 Attacks 
 
Muslims have fought and died in both World War II and the Vietnam War. Some Muslim Americans served in World War II in the North Africa, Europe, and Asia. Additionally, at least 12 Muslims are known to have died in the Vietnam War. Before the abolition of slavery in America, many African Muslim slaves fought for America.

War of 1812
An African slave by the name of Bilali Muhammad defended Georgia's Sapelo Island from British attack during the War of 1812. His group consisted of 80 slaves who were mostly Muslim and were armed with muskets.

Civil War
291 Muslims are known to have fought during the Civil War. Some sources claim that the highest ranking Muslim officer was Captain Moses Osman, the son of Robert and Catherine Osman. However, Moses Osman was confirmed in the Zion German Lutheran Church in 1843 in Harrisburg, Pennsylvania.

The most highly ranked Muslim in the war may be Nicholas Said. He came to the United States in 1860 and he found a teaching job in Detroit. In 1863, Said enlisted in the 55th Massachusetts Colored Regiment in the United States Army and rose to the rank of sergeant.  He was later granted a transfer to a military hospital, where he gained some knowledge of medicine. His Army records state that he died in Brownsville, Tennessee, in 1882. Another Muslim soldier from the Civil War was Max Hassan, an African who worked for the military as a porter.

After WWII
Abdullah Igram, a Muslim-American WWII veteran, campaigned for Islam to be an option in servicemembers' religious identification. His organization provided additional tags that soldiers were permitted to wear starting in 1953, and by then dog tags included codes for 'other' and 'prefer not to say'. By the Vietnam War, personnel could use a wide list of spelled out religion names.

After the 9/11 Attacks

According to the Department of Homeland Security, a total of 6,024 Muslim-American troops served in overseas deployments in the ten years following 9/11, with 14 fatalities reported in Iraq. As of December 2015, there were approximately 5,897 active Muslim members of the US military, accounting for roughly 0.45% of the total. However, practicing Muslim service members are required to shave their beards and other facial hair and often face difficulties obtaining food that meets their dietary requirements, in accordance with military policy. The involvement of Muslim Americans in the military has received increased attention following events such as the September 11 attacks, the 2009 Fort Hood shooting, and Khizr Khan's 2016 Democratic National Convention speech.

Notable Muslims in the Military

Humayun Khan 
Humayun Khan was a Pakistani-American born in the United Arab Emirates on September 9, 1976, to Pakistani parents. After graduating from the University of Virginia in 2000, he joined the U.S. Army's 201st Forward Support Battalion, 1st Infantry Division. Throughout his four years of service, he rose in ranks to become an officer in the U.S. army before being killed by a car bomb June 8, 2004, saving the lives of his fellow soldiers. President Donald Trump’s temporary immigration ban based on a list of terror linked countries (created under the Obama administration) brought Khan's parents, Khizr and Ghazala Khan, into the public spotlight as they addressed Trump at the Democratic National Convention in 2016. Speaking out to defend their son, and others who died in the American military, created an "unexpected and potentially pivotal flash point in the general election".

Colonel Douglas Burpee 
Colonel Douglas Burpee is a retired U.S. Marine, having flown helicopters for 27 years. Burpee was born Episcopalian but converted to Islam when he was 19 in the late 1970s while attending the University of Southern California. He was accepted into the Officers Candidates' School in Quantico, VA, after graduation. At the end of his service, Burpee was the highest ranking Muslim in the U.S. Marine Corps.

Muslim American Military Insignia

See also
United States Air Force Chaplain Corps
United States Army Chaplain Corps
United States Navy Chaplain Corps

References

Military
 M
Islam